Standard Brands is an album by guitarists Lenny Breau and Chet Atkins that was released in 1981.

History
Atkins was instrumental in getting Breau his first recording contract after hearing one of the latter's studio tapes. Atkins stated in an interview for Frets magazine: "Paul Yandell first brought Lenny to my attention around 1966. I immediately knew that here was one of the great players of this world. He had taken some of my fragmentary ideas, and gone on and on into musical areas I had never dreamed of."

Due to Breau's drug problems, the album took nearly two years to complete.

Atkins also produced and recorded two other releases by Breau.

Reception

Writing for Allmusic, music critic Robert Taylor wrote of Standard Brands: "The pairing of these two guitar legends for a series of guitar duets was long overdue, but thankfully was well preserved and finally reissued... The interplay between the duo is a fascinating lesson in the old teaching the new and vice versa... A wonderful piece of guitar history."

Reissues
 The original LP was reissued on CD by One Way Records in 1994.

Track listing

Side one

 "Batucada" (Luiz Bonfá) – 3:19
 "Tenderly" (Walter Gross, Jack Lawrence) – 3:12
 "Cattle Call" (Tex Owens) – 2:08
 "Taking a Chance on Love" (Vernon Duke, Ted Fetter, John Latouche) – 4:35
 "Somebody's Knockin'" (Jerry Gillespie, Ed Penney) – 4:21

Side two

 "This Can't Be Love" (Lorenz Hart, Richard Rodgers) – 3:07
 "This Nearly Was Mine" (Oscar Hammerstein, Richard Rodgers) – 2:39
 "Going Home" (Antonín Dvořák) – 4:35
 "Polka Dots and Moonbeams" (Jimmy Van Heusen, Johnny Burke) – 5:45

Personnel
Chet Atkins – guitar
Lenny Breau – guitar
Technical
Chet Atkins, Mike Poston, Mike Shockley - engineer
Herb Burnette - art direction, photography

References

External links
The Genius of Lenny Breau (PDF document) Retrieved July 3, 2009.

Chet Atkins albums
Lenny Breau albums
1981 albums
RCA Records albums